Agustina Gorzelany (born 11 March 1996) is an Argentine field hockey player. She plays with the Argentina national field hockey team, winning silver medal at the 2020 Summer Olympics.

Hockey career 
Gorzelany was part of the Argentina Junior National Team at the 2016 Junior World Cup where the team won the gold medal, defeating the Netherlands in the final.

In 2017, Gorzelany was called into the senior national women's team, and was part of the team that won the 2017 Pan American Cup.

References

External links
 
 
 

Living people
1996 births
Argentine female field hockey players
South American Games gold medalists for Argentina
South American Games medalists in field hockey
Competitors at the 2018 South American Games
Field hockey players at the 2020 Summer Olympics
Olympic field hockey players of Argentina
Olympic silver medalists for Argentina
Medalists at the 2020 Summer Olympics
Olympic medalists in field hockey
21st-century Argentine women